François Jean de Graindorge d'Orgeville, baron de Mesnil-Durand, known as François-Jean de Mesnil-Durand (1 September 1736, Mesnil-Durand - 13 thermidor year VII, i.e. 31 July 1799, London) was a French tactician.  He collaborated with  marshal de Broglie and supported the ordre profond.

Works 
 Projet d'un ordre françois en tactique, ou la phalange coupée et doublée soutenue par le mélange des armes (1755), printed by Antoine Boudet, Paris. 1 vol. in-4° (xxix, + 446p. + 16 plates)
 Fragments de tactique, ou six mémoires,... précédé d'un Discours Préliminaire sur la Tactique et sur les Systêmes (1774), libr. Ch.-Ant. Ambert, Paris. 2 vol. in-4° : lxviii + 420pp., et viii p.+144pp.+12 plates.

Sources 
Louis du Bois - Notice sur Charles Graindorge d'Orgeville, Baron de Ménil-Durand in Almanach de la ville et de l'arrondissement de Lisieux pour 1839. - Lisieux : Veuve Tissot, [1839].- p. 75-80.

1736 births
1799 deaths
People from Livarot-Pays-d'Auge
Military theorists
French military writers
French Army officers
French male non-fiction writers